Parvati Holcomb is a character in the 2019 video game The Outer Worlds. She was initially conceived by Chris L'Etoile for Obsidian before duties were taken over by Kate Dollarhyde. She is voiced by Ashly Burch, who was chosen for the role after she auditioned and was picked by Dollarhyde for how well she evoked the character. She was originally designed to be asexual by L'Etoile, while Dollarhyde expanded upon this with her own experiences as an asexual person.

Concept and creation
Parvati Holcomb is an engineer and one of the companions that can join players on their quest. She is described as "a very sweet, naive person" by senior narrative designer Megan Starks. She also notes Parvati's personality contrasts with fellow companion Ellie; where Parvati wants to help people, Ellie is more selfish. She was conceived by writer Chris L'Etoile for the 2019 role-playing game The Outer Worlds, created by Obsidian Entertainment, who later left development of the game. He drew inspiration from the character Kaylee Frye from the television series Firefly, and was also the favorite character for Obsidian staff due to her being "so likeable" and having a "very strong moral center." He aimed for her to be an "empathetic moral center" for the main cast, and wrote her to be "a little more naive, but very sweet" and caring. When L'Etoile left, the duties for designing her were given to narrative designer Kate Dollarhyde, who was given an unusual amount of detail in a "very long concept" document, including dialogue for her. It was also unusual to have multiple writers be in charge of a Companion as happened in Parvati's development. 

Parvati is asexual (also called "ace"), a detail given to her by L'Etoile. Dollarhyde, who is also ace, gave Parvati a more "personal voice." Dollarhyde described feeling "lucky" that she was able to "inherit" the writing duties for this character due to this. One of her lines, where Parvati talks about how others treat her as a robot, mirrors Dollarhyde's own experiences. Both Parvati and Dollarhyde are both asexual, and she similarly puts herself into the writing by making Parvati similarly apprehensive about speaking to the person she likes. When writing the romantic elements of Parvati's story, Dollarhyde approached this with the perspective of a friend giving advice and "facilitating good experiences" to those they care about. The details of Dollarhyde's sexuality became more widely known as a result of interviews due to Parvati (and by extension Dollarhyde's) popularity, which she outed herself during. When Parvati reveals her asexuality to the player, Dollarhyde intentionally prevented players from having the option to behave bigoted towards Parvati. Dollarhyde explains that this is because she did not want players who related to Parvati to have the "rug [pulled] out from under them." Parvati was chosen to be introduced to the player early on due to her being a "unique case of a character." Dollarhyde cited how the other Companion characters were more "worldly" than her, and thus Parvati is able to act as the "voice of surprise and delight and horror" for the player as they both see what the world is like, neither being very familiar with it. Other people involved in the creation of Parvati include concept artist Hannah Kennedy who helped design her model, and quality assurance tester Ariana Tavantzis who provided "a lot of" feedback.

Parvati is voiced by Ashly Burch, who was given the role years after the character was first conceived. As such, Dollarhyde had to work with either no spoken dialogue or dialogue spoken by a speech synthesizer while writing, which she found to be an obstacle due to not being able to properly hear her writing out loud by a person. When casting began, Dollarhyde was involved in the process. She was shown an audition for Parvati by Burch, and felt she did the role the way Dollarhyde imagined Parvati sounded. When discussing what she saw in Parvati, Burch explained that it was her ability to find "beauty and wonder in a bleak world" that stood out to her.

Appearances
The player-character first meets Parvati when they visit the office of Reed Tobson, Mayor of the town of Edgewater, walking in on Tobson berating Parvati for not keeping Edgewater's cannery running around the clock. Upon accepting Reed's request to shut off power supplies to his striking workers, the player-character can ask him to release Parvati from her duties so she can help. Once matters are settled with Reed, the player-character can then decide whether to employ Parvati as chief engineer for their ship, the Unreliable.

If Parvati joins the crew of the Unreliable, the player can learn more about her personal feelings and desires. Before boarding the Groundbreaker, Parvati will ask the player-character if they will introduce her to Groundbreaker'''s captain, Junlei Tennyson, expressing admiration for her technical skills. When they meet, Junlei takes a liking to her and appears flirtatious, something which appears to be mutual for Parvati. Over time, Parvati begins to confide to the player-character her feelings for Junlei, as well as her past anxieties relating to intimacy. She eventually reveals herself to be asexual, and clarifies that she is afraid to confess her feelings to Junlei due to past experiences where she was mocked and humiliated for not seeking physical intimacy. The player-character helps Parvati work through her insecurities by getting her drunk at a bar, and she eventually tells Junlei how she feels, which Junlei reciprocates by sending her a poem in which she compares herself to a neglected engine that could only be fixed by an unnamed "engineer". 

Parvati then asks the player-character for help setting up a date for her and Junlei in the Unreliable's mess hall. This requires the player-character to help Parvati obtain perfume and feminine beauty products from a black-market dealer on Groundbreaker, purchase a casserole from a cook on the planet Monarch, and find a stash of sweet cakes in the ruins of an abandoned colony. Parvati will then ask the player-character to purchase new clothes for her from a shop in Halcyon's capital, Byzantium. Once all of these steps are completed, Parvati can go on her date. It goes perfectly, and Parvati and Junlei become romantic partners.

Reception
Parvati has received generally positive reception and has become a fan favorite. Jonathan Logan of RPGFan called her one of the "most adorable characters" he has seen, citing her "wide-eyed wonder" as part of his enjoyment of her. Alan Torres of Digital Trends felt she made a "strong impression," while Matt Sainsbury of Digitally Downloaded said he "loved" her. Charlie Hall of Polygon called her the "biggest thing since Ikumi Nakamura," who was regarded as the "most genuine person of E3 2019." She was later ranked among the best video game characters of the 2010s by Polygon staff, with Hall praising her "painfully genuine" personality, her quest line, and Ashly Burch's performance. Hirun Cryer of USgamer called her the best character in The Outer Worlds, saying that the designation was obvious. He called her "easily likeable" and her willingness to challenge the choices of the player. He further noted her as the most "well-balanced" character in the cast and that she is what got him "hooked" on the game. Fellow USgamer writer Mike Williams felt she started out as "vanilla," she began to be more fleshed out as the game went along. He also noted that her shyness made him behave nicer in the game. Dollarhyde also received an outpouring of support for her work on Parvati. Alex Avard of GamesRadar called her "adorably naive" while praising the relationship between her and the player-character as "believable." Also writing for GamesRadar, Heather Wald expressed disappointment that she could not romance Parvati, citing her "caring personality" and awkwardness as the qualities that attracted her to her. She eventually grew to appreciate her status as a "friend and supporter" of Parvati in her own romantic pursuits. Jess Lee of Digital Spy praised her as the best Companion character in the game, citing her "wholesome" arc.

Parvati's sexuality has led to her being well-received, both by players and critics.  Peter Morics of Screen Rant called her a "champion for marginalized players" as well as the "clear favorite" of the cast, the former due to her asexuality and bisexuality. He noted that this is a rare combination to see represented. He added that the way it's presented is also nice, due to not feeling strange or like a "big twist." He also praised her for her "shyness and optimistic enthusiasm," which he found "endearing." Patrick Klepek for Vice regarded her as the standout character in The Outer Worlds and one of the best of 2019, noting that she has received a fan following in part because of her status as an asexual and bisexual person. He praised her writer and voice actor for helping make her feel "real." Gita Jackson of Kotaku'' described her story as an "examination" of both the difficulties for certain people to fit into society as well as a "touching queer love story."

References

Female characters in video games
Fictional asexuals
LGBT characters in video games
Video game characters introduced in 2019
Fictional bisexual females
Fictional engineers